Kukurha is a village in West Champaran district in the Indian state of Bihar.

Demographics
As of 2011 India census, Kukurha had a population of 5233 in 959 households. Males constitute 51.9% of the population and females 48%. Kukurha has an average literacy rate of 36.49%, lower than the national average of 74%: male literacy is 66.9%, and female literacy is 33%. In Kukurha, 21.9% of the population is under 6 years of age.

References

Villages in West Champaran district